The 1922 UMW Miner strike or The Big Coal Strike was a nationwide strike of miners in the US after the United Mine Worker's (UMW) trade union contract expired on March 31, 1922. The strike decision was ordered March 22 to start effective April 1. 

Around 610,000 mine workers struck, of them 155,000 anthracite and 155,000 bituminous miners.

A historical event connected to the strike is the Herrin massacre. The strike led to the formation of the Federal Coal Commission in September 1922.

Simultaneously, a few months after the start of the UMW Miner strike, on July 1 the Great Railroad Strike of 1922 started. Documentation from before it suggests that some rail workers viewed their fight to be the same as coal miners.

As evidenced below by the labor political comic republished from The Worker on May, 1922 by Labor Age Magazine:  

A contract was reached on September 2, 1922 which covered members of the UMW. It extended the agreement terms of the previous contract to August 31,1923. After ratification, mining resumed on September 11. The general coal strike lasted 163 days. However nearly 70,000 un-unionized mining workers were not covered by the UMW contract. 

After the UMW ended their strike, around 25,000 Windber, Pennsylvania miners continued striking. Until miners voted to end it on August 14, 1923, failing to gain a contract.

See also 

 Great Railroad Strike of 1922
 United Mine Workers coal strike of 1919

References

Miners' labor disputes in the United States
1922 in the United States
Labor history of the United States
1922 labor disputes and strikes
Labor disputes led by the United Mine Workers of America